Jose Maria Marfori Asuncion (March 28, 1939 – July 19, 2003), better known by his stage-name Vic Vargas, was a Filipino film actor and judoka.

Early life and career
Vic Vargas was born on March 28, 1939. When he was 17, Vargas won three championships for judo in the Philippines. He finished architecture at the University of Santo Tomas and then afterwards, became a physical education instructor teaching martial arts at the University of the East.

Eventually, he reluctantly entered show business after being challenged by a friend, and then, he debuted in the film Diegong Tabak in 1962.  His early films also include pairing with Filipina actress Josephine Estrada particularly in the film Prinsipeng Tulisan made by VP Pictures, a subsidiary of Sampaguita Pictures, where he was one of its contract actor. Being an expert on judo, he became a judo instructor for a television program broadcast by Channel 7.

Later career
He starred in numerous films from early 1960s up to 2002. He was typecast in certain genres like action and sexy comedy due to his dark skin, figure and sex appeal. In 1971, he got a role in the Ismael Bernal's Pagdating sa Dulo, which was voted by Manunuri ng Pelikulang Pilipino as one of the best films of the 1970s. In the film El Vibora, he won his first Best Actor award given by the organizers of the 1972 Manila Film Festival. He won again as Best Actor the next year on the same festival for the film Nueva Vizcaya.

In the mid-1970s, he was an on and off-cam pair with 1969 Miss Universe Gloria Diaz. Their first film together was in Ang Pinakamagandang Hayop sa Balat ng Lupa, that started a wet-and-wild trend in Philippine cinema. The tandem also starred in the Andres de Saya film series. In the 1982 film In This Corner by Filipino director Lino Brocka, he got an Urian Best Actor nomination.

Aside being a film actor, he also appeared on television and he became one of the cast of the television show Lahi ni Adan and briefly hosted Tawag ng Tanghalan after the death of Lopito, the original male host of the show. He also appeared in the sitcom television show of ABS-CBN, Home Along Da Riles. Other notable films that he starred include Pito ang Asawa Ko, Sinong Kapiling, Sinong Kasiping?, Banta ng Kahapon, and The King and the Emperor.

He was also known for being one of the first actors who entered the Charismatic movement in the Philippines. He also became an environmentalist after becoming a member of the environmental group Bantay-Dagat in Palawan. One of his last films include portraying Rajah Humabon in the 2002 biopic film Lapu-Lapu, with Lito Lapid portraying the title character.

Personal life 
Vargas was married to Rosanna Zamora and they have a child named Basilio Anton Asuncion.

Death
He died at the age of 64 on July 19, 2003, 15 days after he suffered from a stroke and fell into coma. He was rushed to the San Juan de Dios Hospital in Pasay after having a typhoid fever in Subic that caused his stroke when he returned to Manila. He was cremated and buried at Sacred Heart Church in Makati where his parents' body lie.

Filmography

Film

Television

Notes

References

External links

1939 births
2003 deaths
Filipino male film actors
Filipino male judoka
Filipino martial artists